The Turks and Caicos Islands Regiment is the home defence unit of the British Overseas Territory of the Turks and Caicos Islands. It is a single territorial infantry and engineer reserve unit of the British Armed Forces that was formed in 2020. The Regiment has an authorized strength level objective of 46 personnel, akin to that of a platoon-sized unit.

Background
The Turks and Caicos Islands, as a British Overseas Territory, are defended by the United Kingdom.

History
Governor Nigel Dakin announced in early December 2019 that the Turks and Caicos was going to build its own defence regiment, the Turks and Caicos Regiment, with the assistance of the United Kingdom Ministry of Defence, similar to the Royal Bermuda Regiment, the Cayman Islands Regiment, the Royal Montserrat Defence Force, the Falkland Islands Defence Force, and the Royal Gibraltar Regiment. The Turks and Caicos Regiment, like the Royal Bermuda Regiment and the Cayman Islands Regiment, would focus on increasing the nation's security, and, in times of natural disasters, the regiment would be trained in engineering and communications. In mid-December 2019, a team from the United Kingdom Ministry of Defence was on Turks and Caicos to start building the regiment. It is projected that the Turk and Caicos Regiment will become operational sometime in the third quarter of 2020.

In spring 2020, a Security and Assistance Team from the United Kingdom Ministry of Defence arrived in Turks and Caicos to assist with the COVID-19 pandemic, the 2020 Atlantic hurricane season, and to help build the new Turks and Caicos Regiment.

In early June 2020, Lieutenant Colonel Ennis Grant was appointed as commanding officer of the new Turks and Caicos Regiment. An additional five permanent staff and forty reserve posts consisting of non-commissioned officers and marines will be recruited later in 2020.

Major John Galleymore was appointed as Second-in-Command of the Turks and Caicos Islands Regiment.

Commanding officers 
As of January 2020, the commanding officer is Lieutenant Colonel Ennis Grant.

See also 
 British Army Training and Support Unit Belize
 Overseas military bases of the United Kingdom

References 

Regiments of the British Army
British colonial regiments
Military units and formations established in 2020
Turks and Caicos Islands